Bruno Andrade may refer to:

 Bruno Andrade (footballer, born 1989), Brazilian footballer for Dutch club Go Ahead Eagles
 Bruno Andrade (footballer, born 1993), Portuguese footballer who last played for English club Salford City
 Bruno Andrade (racing driver) (born 1991), Brazilian racing driver
 Bruno Lança Andrade (born 1983), Brazilian footballer
 Bruno Andrade de Toledo Nascimento (born 1991), Brazilian footballer for Portuguese club C.D. Feirense